Affair in Havana is a 1957 American film noir crime film directed by László Benedek and written by Maurice Zimm. It stars Raymond Burr and John Cassavetes.

The film is about a piano player who falls in love with a crippled man's wife.

Plot
Mallabee is a millionaire sugar-cane grower in Cuba who blames his wife, Lorna, for an accident that has left him in a wheelchair.

Lorna has been having an affair with Nick, a piano player in a Havana nightclub. Mallabee secretly is aware of this, having hired a private investigator to follow his wife.

The twisted mind of Mallabee has come up with a scheme in which Lorna kills him. She won't do it, but a trusted servant, Valdes, does cause his death by drowning. However, the relationship between Nick and Lorna comes to an unhappy end.

Cast

Production
The film was called The Fever Tree and started filming 6 August 1956.

See also
 List of American films of 1957

References

External links
 
 
 
  featuring Celia Cruz

1957 films
1950s crime thriller films
American black-and-white films
Film noir
Films scored by Ernest Gold
American crime thriller films
Films set in Havana
Allied Artists films
Films shot in Havana
Films directed by László Benedek
1950s English-language films
1950s American films